The Honda Group (Tsh, Ngh) is a geological group of the Upper and Middle Magdalena Basins and the adjacent Central and Eastern Ranges of the Colombian Andes. The group, in older literature also defined as formation, is in its present-day type section in the Tatacoa Desert in the department of Huila subdivided into two main formations; La Victoria and Villavieja.

The group was originally defined in and named after Honda, Tolima, but has been redefined based on the many fossil finds in the Tatacoa Desert,  to the south.

The group dates to the Neogene period; in its broadest definition from the Late Oligocene to Late Miocene, and in the redefined type section restricted to the Laventan age of the South American Land Mammal Ages (SALMA), equivalent to the Middle Miocene Serravallian epoch.

The Honda Group is a Konzentrat-Lagerstätte at the fossiliferous La Venta site in the department of Huila and eastern Tolima and hosts one of the richest formations containing Miocene fauna worldwide.

Etymology and definitions 

The group was first defined by Hettner in 1892 in the area of the town after which it is named; Honda, Tolima. In 1942 and 1946, the group was defined as a formation by Royo and Gómez. The first author who used the name Honda for a group, was American zoologist who studied the La Venta fauna in detail, Ruben Arthur Stirton. Subdivisions of the group have been proposed by many different authors with high detail in the different beds. Names as "Monkey Beds", "Fish Beds" and "Unit above Fish Beds" have been colloquially used to designate certain stratigraphic units based on their fossil content. The most accepted definition of the group, formations and members was proposed by Villarroel et al. in 1996 to simplify the stratigraphy in a regional sense solving the excessive subdivision into 19 units by Guerrero et al. (1994).

Regional setting 
Today, the sediments of the Honda Group are exposed in the Middle (Valle Medio del Magdalena, VMM) and Upper Magdalena Valley (Valle Superior del Magdalena, VSM) in an intermontane valley between the Central Ranges in the west and the Eastern Ranges in the east. The valley in between the two major orogenic chains is filled by the Magdalena River, the longest river of Colombia. The Upper Magdalena Valley geologically is subdivided into the Neiva Sub-basin with the Girardot Sub-basin of the southernmost Middle Magdalena Valley to the north, divided by the Natagaima Arch. The Neiva Sub-basin is bound by the Chusma Fault in the west and to the east by the west-verging Garzón Fault. The Mulato-Getudo Fault possibly underlies the Honda Group south of the La Miel River. The Tatacoa Desert, where the type section of the Honda Group has been redefined is an unusually dry region in Colombia, caused by a mountain induced rain-shadow effect. In Middle Miocene times, the geography was more comparable to the present eastern foothills of the Andes.

The tectonic history of the three mountain chains of Colombia, from west to east, the Western, Central and Eastern Ranges has been studied in detail. The Western and Central Ranges were the first to be exhumed in the Paleogene, with minor uplifts in the Eastern Ranges at this age. The onset of the regional uplift of the Eastern Ranges is dated around the Middle Miocene, with an increased rate of exhumation between 12 and 3 Ma. This caused a segmentation of the current Magdalena Basins and the Llanos Basin to the east, previously part of a larger foreland basin to the east of the Central Ranges. The León Formation in the Llanos Basin provides the first indication of the tectonic uplift of the Eastern Ranges, isolating the Llanos Basin from the Magdalena Valley.

Description

Stratigraphy 
The Honda Group unconformably overlies in parts the volcanic deposits of the Prado Member, Barzalosa Formation of the Payandé Group, and in other parts the Saldaña, and Santa Teresa Formations. The unit is overlain by the Neiva Formation of the Gigante Group. The presence of a hiatus between the Honda Group and the Barzalosa Formation has been suggested. The group is characterised by two main formations; the lower La Victoria Formation and upper Villavieja Formation. Previously, the La Dorada Formation has been named as a subdivision of the Honda Group, while other authors define that unit as a member. Other names for members and formations are Cerbatana Member, also published as Cervetana Member, named after Quebrada La Cerbatana, Las Mesitas Formation, El Líbano Formation, Baraya Volcanic Member, named after Baraya, and Cerro Colorado Red Bed Member. The Perico Member of the La Dorada Formation has been made equivalent to the La Victoria Formation, as well as the El Líbano Formation.

La Victoria Formation 
This formation was first defined by Guerrero in his Master's thesis (1991) and further refined in his doctoral thesis in 1993. The formation, restricted to the Neiva Sub-basin, consists mainly of sandstones, conglomeratic sandstones and conglomerates (75%) with intercalated claystones and siltstones (25%).

The upper part of the La Victoria Formation, underlying the Villavieja Formation, is characterised by a  section of conglomerates, designated the Cerbatana Member or Cerbatana Conglomerates. The conglomerate shows trough-cross lamination and imbrication of clasts in a predominantly matrix-supported sequence, with minor clast-supported sections. The base of the conglomerate marks an erosional surface into the underlying silt and clay beds. The sandstones are cemented by calcium carbonate in hardgrounds that sometimes form rounded concretions.

Villavieja Formation 

The name Villavieja Formation was first proposed by Wellman in 1968 as a member of the Honda Formation. Two years later, the author elevated the rank to a formation, as part of the Honda Group. The formation takes its name from the municipality Villavieja, Huila,   to the north-northeast of the departmental capital Neiva. The type locality is situated on the right bank of the Magdalena River in the Eastern Ranges of the Colombian Andes.

The contact between the Villavieja Formation and the underlying La Victoria Formation is concordant. The basal part of the Villavieja Formation comprises siltstones and claystones that also form the bulk of the formation with 75 percent. The remaining quarter is composed of conglomeratic sandstones. The thickness of the siltstones and claystones can exceed  and have interspersed fine- to medium-grained  thin sandstone beds. The fine sediments of the Villavieja Formation are coloured greenish, reddish-brown or bluish-grey and display weathering patterns in so-called "cauliflower erosion" structures. The light grey coarser beds, up to conglomeratic sandstone size, do not exceed  in thickness and commonly show a lateral transition with the silt- and claystones. The Baraya Member of the Villavieja Formation shows thin yellowish and reddish brown sandstone and siltstone levels with volcaniclastic grains.

Honda area 
Outcrops along the road between Girardot and Agua de Dios, Cundinamarca show a lower sequence of thick beds of greenish-yellow feldspar- and mica-rich conglomeratic sandstones, intercalated with reddish claystones and an upper level of alternating medium-to-coarse grained quartz arenites with low-angle cross stratification. These sandstones are intercalated with thick layers of fissile claystones with common calcareous sandstone concretions. Sediments of the Honda Group restrict the course of the Sumapaz River to a narrow valley, close to its confluence with the Magdalena River.

The majority of the municipality Prado, Tolima rests upon sediments of the Honda Group. In the Middle Magdalena Basin and the eastern flank of the Central and the western flank of the Eastern Ranges, the group is subdivided into the Los Limones, San Antonio and Cambrás Formations. The total thickness of these formations in the northern original type section of the Honda Group reaches , while a total thickness of  has been registered.

Age 
Thanks to the fossil abundance of the Honda Group at La Venta, the geological period of the sediments has received a separate name in the South American Mammal Ages (SALMA); Laventan, ranging from 13.8 to 11.8 Ma, as the only SALMA age defined north of the equator and in Colombia. The age of the Villavieja Formation has been estimated to be between 17.0 and 12.1 Ma, while the stratigraphically lower La Victoria Formation is dated at 13.82 to 12.38 Ma (Serravallian), based on fission track and volcanic analysis and paleomagnetic research.

The Honda Group is laterally time equivalent with the lower part of the Real Formation in the central and northern Middle Magdalena Basin, the lower part of the León Formation of the Llanos Basin, the upper range of the Ciénaga de Oro Formation of the Lower Magdalena Basin, and the Caja and Diablo Formations of the Llanos foothills.

Depositional environment 

The Honda Group has been deposited in a fluvial environment, with the lower part of the La Victoria Formation in a meandering setting, while the upper part was formed in a braided river system. The paleocurrent was from the west to the east and east-southeast. The overlying predominantly finer grained Villavieja Formation was deposited in a meandering setting of a smaller size than those of the older La Victoria Formation. Paleocurrent analysis of the sediments in the Baraya and Cerro Colorado Members has revealed a similar flow direction as the La Victoria paleorivers, while the upper part of the Cerro Colorado Member shows an opposite trend to the west. The volcanic clasts of the formations have as provenance the Central Range volcanism, of which the volcaniclastics in the Honda Group mark its onset.

The depositional boundary for the Honda Group in the east is formed by the reverse Prado-Suárez and Cambrás-Salinas-Cambao Faults.

Paleoclimate and vegetation 
Today, these levels of rainfall are associated with the transition between savanna and forest environments in lowland South America. It has been suggested that the vegetational cover of the Honda Group sedimentary sequence was not a continuous canopy forest, yet a complex pattern of different flora ecosystems. The evergreen Amazonian foothill forests of today would therefore postdate the uplift of the Eastern Ranges of the Andes. Based on vegetational and grazer diversity analysis of the La Venta fauna, it has been suggested the ecosystem resembled more that of Africa and Asia than of the modern Neotropics. Research of the paleosols found in various levels within the Honda Group suggests the presence of arid areas in close proximity to pluvial parts.

Petroleum geology 
In the oil-producing Upper Magdalena Basin, the Honda Group is one of the reservoir formations, next to the more important Caballos and Monserrate Formations. Shales of the Honda Group function as seal rock for certain oilfields in the Upper Magdalena Basin. In the Tello Field in the basin, the Honda Group forms the overburden rock for the producing Monserrate reservoirs.

Fossil content 

The Honda Group is the richest fossiliferous stratigraphic unit of Colombia, and one of the most important for the Miocene worldwide. At the La Venta site, numerous fossils of various orders have been recovered and are found still. The site marks a unique ecosystem showing a broad range of biodiversity. La Venta is also an important site as it represents the youngest uniquely South American faunal assemblage before the Great American Biotic Interchange; the result of the uplift of the Isthmus of Panama, of which the initial phase has been dated at around 12 Ma. This led to a drastic alteration of the South American former island continental fauna. The Sparassodonta formed the dominant carnivorous mammal group in South America during most of the Cenozoic.

In South America, the carnivorous adaptive zone in terrestrial ecosystems was shared with other mammals; terror birds (Phorusrhacoidea), large crocodiles (Sebecidae), large snakes (Madsoiidae and Boidae), and even occasionally frogs. The diversity of fossil freshwater fishes and crocodilians at La Venta is the richest assemblage of South America. Fossilised trunks of Goupioxylon sp. have been identified in the Honda Group.

The genus names Hondadelphys and Hondathentes, and the species epithets of Anadasypus hondanus and Scirrotherium hondaensis refer to the Honda Group. The giant sloth Brievabradys laventensis, the primate Stirtonia tatacoensis (originally described as Kondous laventicus), and the marsupial Micoureus laventicus were named after La Venta, while the primates Miocallicebus villaviejai and Stirtonia victoriae received their species epithets from the formations comprising the Honda Group.

Mammals

Birds

Reptiles and amphibians

Fish and crustaceans

Panorama

Regional correlations 

Legend

 group
 important formation
 fossiliferous formation
 minor formation
 
 proximal Llanos (Medina)
 distal Llanos (Saltarin 1A well)



 Laventan correlations 

 See also 
 Cretaceous stratigraphy of the central Colombian Eastern Ranges
 Early Cretaceous stratigraphy of Iberia

 Sources 
 Notes 

 References 

 Bibliography 
 General 

 
 
 
 

 Llanos Basin 

 
 
 
 

 
 
 
 
 
 

 Basement 

 
 
 
 

 'Paleozoic' 

 
 
 
 

 'Jurassic' 

 

 Maps 
National
 
 

Regional
 
 
 

 Llanos Basin 
 
 
 
 
 
 
 
 
 
 
 

 Catatumbo Basin 
 
 
 

 Eastern Cordillera 

 
 
 
 
 
 
 
 
 
 

 
 
 
 
 

 
 
 
 
 
 

 Upper Magdalena Valley (VSM) 
 
 

 
 
 
 
 
 
 
 
 
 
 

 Caguán-Putumayo Basin 
 

 
 
 
 
 
 
 
 
 
 
 
 

¤
¤

See also 

 Geology of the Eastern Hills
 Geology of the Ocetá Páramo
 Geology of the Altiplano Cundiboyacense
 Bogotá, Cerrejón, Floresta, Paja Formations

Notes

References

Bibliography

Regional geology

Local geology

Paleontology

Maps

External links 

  Faunas del Cenozoico de Colombia
  Fauna de La Venta - aspectos geológicos

 
Geologic formations of Colombia
Neogene Colombia
Burdigalian
Langhian
Serravallian
Miocene fossil record
Miocene volcanism
 
Conglomerate formations
Sandstone formations
Shale formations
Siltstone formations
Tuff formations
Fluvial deposits
Formations
Formations
Formations
Geology